This article contains information about the literary events and publications of 1702.

Events
March 8 (O.S.) – Accession of Anne, Queen of Great Britain, upon the death of her brother-in-law William III.
March 11 (O.S.) – The first regular English national newspaper, The Daily Courant, begins publication, in Fleet Street in the City of London. It covers only foreign news.
October – Jonathan Swift returns to Ireland in the company of Esther Johnson.
unknown dates
Ballet master John Weaver presents the burlesque Tavern Bilkers at the Theatre Royal, Drury Lane in London, the first English pantomime. It is not a success.
The first book set in the Romain du Roi Roman type, devised for use by the Imprimerie nationale in France: Médailles sur les principaux événements du règne de Louis le Grand, is printed.
Castle Howard in Yorkshire, England, is completed to the design of playwright John Vanbrugh and architect Nicholas Hawksmoor.

New books

Prose
Louise de Bossigny, comtesse d'Auneuil – La Tiranie des fées détruite (The Tyranny of the Fairies Destroyed)
Thomas Brown, et al. – Letters From the Dead to the Living
Edmund Calamy – An Abridgement of Mr Baxter's History of His Life and Times
Daniel Defoe
An Enquiry into Occasional Conformity
The Mock-Mourners (on the death of William III)
A New Test of the Church of England's Loyalty
Reformation of Manners
The Shortest Way with the Dissenters (anonymous; December)
The Spanish Descent
John Dennis – The Monument
Laurence Echard – A General Ecclesiastical History
George Farquhar – Love and Business
Edmund Gibson – Synodus Anglicana (on the convocation)
Charles Gildon (?) – A Comparison Between the Two Stages (on the "War of the Theatres")
Examen Miscellaneum
Edward Hyde, 1st Earl of Clarendon – The History of the Rebellion and Civil Wars in England (1702–1704, written in the 1640s and late 1660s. Also known as Clarendon's History)
George Keith – The Standard of the Quakers Examined
John Kersey – A New English Dictionary; or, a complete collection of the most proper and significant words, commonly used in the language
Cotton Mather – Magnalia Christi Americana
Matthew Prior – To a Young Gentleman in Love
John Toland – Paradoxes of State
Catherine Trotter Cockburn – A Defence of the Essay of Human Understanding (re John Locke)

Drama
William Burnaby – The Modish Husband
Susanna Centlivre – 
 The Beau's Duel
 The Stolen Heiress 
Colley Cibber – She Would and She Would Not
John Dennis – The Comical Gallant
George Farquhar
The Inconstant
The Twin Rivals
 Charles Gildon – The Patriot
Bevil Higgons – The Generous Conqueror (printed, performed in 1701)
Francis Manning – All for the Better
John Oldmixon – The Governor of Cyprus
Nicholas Rowe
The Fair Penitent (adaptation of Massinger and Field's The Fair Penitent, performed, printed in 1703)
Tamerlane (printed, performed in 1701)
Sir Charles Sedley – The Tyrant King of Crete
John Vanbrugh – The False Friend

Poetry

Matsuo Bashō (posthumously) – Oku no Hosomichi (Narrow Road to the Deep North)

Births
June 26 – Philip Doddridge, English religious and writer and hymnist (died 1751)
Unknown date – Margareta Momma, Swedish journalist and publisher (died 1772)

Deaths
January 1 – Samuel Green, American printer (born c. 1614)
January 17 – Roger Morrice, English journalist and diarist (born 1628)
February 17 – Peder Syv, Danish philologist, folklorist and priest (born 1631)
April 22 – François Charpentier, French archeologist and writer (born 1620)
May 17 (bur.) – Richard Sault, English mathematician, editor and translator (unknown year of birth)
May 27 – Dominique Bouhours, French literary critic (born 1628)
November – John Pomfret, English poet (born 1667)

References

 
Years of the 18th century in literature